VfB Stuttgart had an average season in its first season under Felix Magath. It finished 8th in Bundesliga, qualifying for the Intertoto Cup. The season also saw Stuttgart breaking its transfer record, when the club signed Fernando Meira for € 7.5 million.

First-team squad
Squad at end of season

Results

Bundesliga
 Stuttgart-Köln 0–0
 Hamburg-Stuttgart 2–0
 1–0 Jörg Albertz 
 2–0 Erik Meijer 
 Stuttgart-Werder Bremen 0–0
 Nürnberg-Stuttgart 2–4
 0–1 Ionel Ganea 
 1–1 Marek Nikl 
 2–1 Marek Nikl 
 2–2 Jens Todt 
 2–3 Ionel Ganea 
 2–4 Adhemar 
 Stuttgart-Hertha BSC 0–0
 Wolfsburg-Stuttgart 0–2
 0–1 Jochen Seitz 
 0–2 Krassimir Balakov 
 Stuttgart-Hansa Rostock 2–1
 0–1 Andreas Jakobsson 
 1–1 Krassimir Balakov 
 2–1 Ionel Ganea 
 Bayern Munich-Stuttgart 4–0
 1–0 Giovane Élber 
 2–0 Giovane Élber 
 3–0 Giovane Élber 
 4–0 Paulo Sérgio 
 Stuttgart-Schalke 04 3–0
 1–0 Marcelo Bordon 
 2–0 Ionel Ganea 
 3–0 Alexander Hleb 
 Bayer Leverkusen-Stuttgart 4–1
 0–1 Ionel Ganea 
 1–1 Zé Roberto 
 2–1 Boris Živković 
 3–1 Lúcio 
 4–1 Dimitar Berbatov 
 Stuttgart-St. Pauli 2–0
 1–0 Christian Tiffert 
 2–0 Jochen Endress 
 Borussia Dortmund-Stuttgart 1–0
 1–0 Lars Ricken 
 Stuttgart-Freiburg 3–0
 1–0 Silvio Meißner 
 2–0 Christian Tiffert 
 3–0 Jochen Seitz 
 Energie Cottbus-Stuttgart 0–0
 Stuttgart-Mönchengladbach 1–1
 1–0 Timo Wenzel 
 1–1 Marco Kuntzel 
 Stuttgart-1860 Munich 0–1
 0–1 Didier Dheedene 
 Kaiserslautern-Stuttgart 2–2
 1–0 Ratinho 
 1–1 Silvio Meißner 
 2–1 Vratislav Lokvenc 
 2–2 Kevin Kurányi 
 Köln-Stuttgart 0–0
 Stuttgart-Hamburg 3–0
 1–0 Ionel Ganea 
 2–0 Ingo Hertzsch 
 3–0 Marcelo Bordon 
 Werder Bremen-Stuttgart 1–2
 1–0 Marco Bode 
 1–1 Ionel Ganea 
 1–2 Christian Tiffert 
 Stuttgart-Nürnberg 2–3
 0–1 Cacau 
 1–1 Marcelo Bordon 
 1–2 Cacau 
 2–2 Ionel Ganea 
 2–3 Tommy Svindal Larsen 
 Hertha BSC-Stuttgart 2–0
 1–0 Marcelinho 
 2–0 Marcelinho 
 Stuttgart-VfL Wolfsburg 2–1
 1–0 Silvio Meißner 
 2–0 Alexander Hleb 
 2–1 Diego Klimowicz 
 Hansa Rostock-Stuttgart 1–1
 1–0 René Rydlewicz 
 1–1 Fernando Meira 
 Stuttgart-Bayern Munich 0–2
 0–1 Roque Santa Cruz 
 0–2 Mehmet Scholl 
 Schalke 04-Stuttgart 2–1
 1–0 Tomasz Wałdoch 
 1–1 Adhemar 
 2–1 Ebbe Sand 
 Stuttgart-Bayer Leverkusen 0–2
 0–1 Thomas Brdarić 
 0–2 Dimitar Berbatov 
 St. Pauli-Stuttgart 1–2
 0–1 Krassimir Balakov 
 0–2 Sean Dundee 
 1–2 Matías Cenci 
 Stuttgart-Borussia Dortmund 3–2
 1–0 Sean Dundee 
 2–0 Silvio Meißner 
 2–1 Christian Wörns 
 3–1 Ionel Ganea 
 3–2 Jan Koller 
 Freiburg-Stuttgart 0–2
 0–1 Fernando Meira 
 0–2 Steffen Handschuh 
 Stuttgart-Energie Cottbus 0–0
 Mönchengladbach-Stuttgart 2–2
 0–1 Krassimir Balakov 
 1–1 Peter Van Houdt 
 2–1 Benjamin Auer 
 2–2 Sean Dundee 
 1860 Munich-Stuttgart 3–3
 0–1 Sean Dundee 
 0–2 Silvio Meißner 
 1–2 Martin Max 
 2–2 Martin Max 
 2–3 Silvio Meißner 
 3–3 Daniel Borimirov 
 Stuttgart-Kaiserslautern 4–3
 1–0 Silvio Meißner 
 1–1 Lincoln 
 2–1 Sean Dundee 
 2–2 Marian Hristov 
 3–2 Silvio Meißner 
 3–3 Miroslav Klose 
 4–3 Ionel Ganea

Topscorers
  Ionel Ganea 10
  Silvio Meißner 7
  Sean Dundee 5

Kits

Sources
  Results & Fixtures for Stuttgart – soccerbase.com

References

Notes

VfB Stuttgart seasons
Stuttgart